Liceo María Auxiliadora is a Chilean high school located in Santa Cruz, Colchagua Province, Chile.

The school opened its doors in March 1889, with an enrollment of 13 students under the direction of Mother Angela Vallese.

References 

Educational institutions established in 1889
Secondary schools in Chile
Schools in Colchagua Province
1889 establishments in Chile